Budinger is a German language locational surname, which originally meant a person from Büdingen in Germany. The name may refer to:

Chase Budinger (born 1988), American basketball player
Hugo Budinger (born 1927), German field hockey player
Sol Budinger (born 1999), English cricketer 
Victoria Mae "Miss Vicki" Budinger, first wife of entertainer Tiny Tim

Other uses
103740 Budinger, a minor planet

References

German-language surnames